The Vancouver Giants are a major junior ice hockey team playing in the Western Hockey League (WHL). Inaugurated in 2001–02, the Giants have won one Ed Chynoweth Cup in 2006 and one Memorial Cup in 2007. Their home rink was the Pacific Coliseum in Vancouver, British Columbia, an arena previously used by the National Hockey League (NHL)'s Vancouver Canucks. Effective with the 2016–17 season, the team relocated to the Langley Events Centre in the Township of Langley, a suburb of Vancouver.

The ownership group consists of British Columbia-based businessmen Ron Toigo and Sultan Thiara, the estate of Hockey Hall of Fame member Gordie Howe and Canadian big band singer Michael Bublé. Pat Quinn was also a part-owner until his death on November 23, 2014.

History
Led by majority owner and British Columbia-based businessman Ron Toigo, the City of Vancouver was granted a WHL franchise for the 2001–02 season. In their inaugural campaign, the Giants compiled 13 wins, 49 losses and six ties. The first goal in franchise history was scored by Tyson Mulock in a loss to the Kamloops Blazers.

The following season, the Giants went 26–37–5–4, good for fourth in the B.C. Division, and made their first playoff appearance, but lost in the first round to the eventual President's Cup champions, the Kelowna Rockets, in four games. Second-year forward Adam Courchaine led the team in scoring with 85 points. His 43 goals stood as a single-season franchise record for six years until second-year forward Evander Kane broke it in 2008–09.

In the 2003–04 season, the Giants continued to improve, posting a 33–24–9–6, which marked their first winning season. After defeating the Kamloops Blazers in the first round, the Giants lost in the second round to the expansion team Everett Silvertips in six games. Adam Courchaine led the team again in scoring, finishing ninth overall in the League. Hometown rookie Gilbert Brule, the first overall pick in the 2002 WHL Bantam Draft, scored 60 points and earned the Jim Piggott Memorial Trophy as the WHL's best first-year player.

In the 2004–05 season, the Giants went 34–30–4–4 and Brule emerged as a WHL star, finishing third in League scoring with 87 points, which remained a franchise record until overager Casey Pierro-Zabotel snapped it in 2008–09. Courchaine tallied 78 points and finished seventh in League scoring, marking the first time that the top ten WHL scorers would feature two Giants players. In the playoffs, the Giants lost in the first round to Kelowna. Despite the early exit, the Giants drew many fans to the Coliseum that year due to the NHL lockout; Game 6 against the Rockets drew 16,183 fans.

The 2005–06 season featured the Giants' most significant improvement in the standings, becoming one of the WHL's top teams. They finished the season 47–19–0–6, first in the B.C. Division and third in the League overall. In the first round of the playoffs, the Giants beat the Prince George Cougars in five games, then the Portland Winterhawks in the second round, also in five games. In the third and final round, they won eight-straight, sweeping both the Everett Silvertips and Moose Jaw Warriors en route to their first-ever President's Cup. Gilbert Brule had returned to the team midway through the season after starting 2005–06 with the NHL's Columbus Blue Jackets and earned the airBC Trophy as the playoff MVP after scoring 16 goals and 30 points in 18 post-season games, including five goals and 12 points in the finals.

By winning the WHL league title, the Giants earned their first Memorial Cup appearance in Moncton, New Brunswick. The Giants finished the round-robin tied for third, then defeated the Peterborough Petes in a tie-breaker in order to move on to the playoffs, but lost to the Moncton Wildcats in the semifinal. Brule scored 12 points in five games, earning the Ed Chynoweth Trophy as tournament leading scorer. He was also named to the Memorial Cup All-Star Team along with Giants defenceman Paul Albers.

The Giants were chosen by the Canadian Hockey League (CHL) prior to the 2006 Memorial Cup to host the 2007 edition. They finished the season, once again, atop their division and fourth overall in the League. The season featured a goaltending controversy in which starter Dustin Slade would begin the season splitting time with emerging goalie Tyson Sexsmith. Slade, frustrated with having to relinquish starts, would leave the team in November to pursue a professional playing career. With Sexsmith, who finished first in the WHL in goals against average (GAA), as their starting goalie, and a balanced offence that included the likes of Milan Lucic, Michal Repik and mid-season acquisitions Wacey Rabbit and Kenndal McArdle, the Giants made their way once again to the WHL final. The series went the distance against the Medicine Hat Tigers, but the Giants lost the seventh and deciding game in double overtime, failing to win their second consecutive WHL title. However, due to their automatic bye into the Memorial Cup as hosts, the Giants avenged their seventh game loss against the Tigers, defeating Medicine Hat 3–1 in the Cup final, capturing their first-ever Memorial Cup title. Lucic earned the Stafford Smythe Memorial Trophy as tournament MVP, while linemate Michal Repik led the tournament in scoring — edging Lucic by one goal — to capture the Ed Chynoweth Trophy. Defenceman Cody Franson also joined Lucic and Repik on the tournament All-Star Team.

As defending Memorial Cup champions the following season, the Giants won the B.C. Division for the third consecutive year and posted a franchise-record 106 points (49–15–2–6), enough for third in the League. Third-year forward Spencer Machacek, named team captain after incumbent captain Milan Lucic would play with the Boston Bruins of the NHL, led the team in scoring with 78 points, 14th overall in the League. On defence, Jonathon Blum, also a returnee from the Memorial Cup-winning team, finished second among League defencemen in scoring, tallying 63 points, a single-season franchise-record among defenceman. In goal, Sexsmith once again led the WHL with a stellar 1.89 GAA. The Giants' run for a third consecutive Memorial Cup appearance, however, was cut short; after sweeping the Chilliwack Bruins in the first round, the Giants were ousted by the Spokane Chiefs in six games.

A dominant 2008–09 season established several records for the Giants. The club set a WHL record by clinching a playoff berth just 46 games into the season. The mark was previously set by the Everett Silvertips, who clinched a berth after 48 games in 2006–07. Individually, overager Casey Pierro-Zabotel broke the team marks for single-season assists and points, surpassing Darren Lynch and Gilbert Brule, respectively, while second-year forward Evander Kane bettered Adam Courchaine's single-season goals total. Team captain Jonathon Blum also surpassed Courchaine to become the franchise's all-time assists leader. Finishing the season with a franchise-high 57 wins and 119 points, the Giants came within three points of their first Scotty Munro Memorial Trophy as the top regular season team, behind the Calgary Hitmen.

Awards and trophies

Championships

Memorial Cup
Canadian Hockey League champion
 2007 – Champions
 2006 – 3rd place

Ed Chynoweth Cup
Western Hockey League playoff champion
 2019 — Finalists
 2007 – Finalists
 2006 – Champions

Western Conference Champions
 2005–06, 2006–07, 2018–19
B.C. Division Champions
First place in regular season
 2005–06, 2006–07, 2007–08, 2008–09, 2009–10, 2018–19

Individual

WHL

Jim Piggott Memorial Trophy
Rookie of the year
 Gilbert Brule – 2003–04

Bill Hunter Memorial Trophy
Defenceman of the year
 Jonathon Blum – 2008–09

WHL Plus-Minus Award
Regular season plus-minus leader
 Paul Albers – 2005–06
 Jonathon Blum – 2006–07

Doug Wickenheiser Memorial Trophy
Humanitarian of the year
 Ty Ronning – 2017–18

Bob Clarke Trophy
Regular season scoring champion
 Casey Pierro-Zabotel – 2008–09

Dunc McCallum Memorial Trophy
Coach of the Year
 Don Hay – 2008–09

CHL

Ed Chynoweth Trophy
Memorial Cup scoring leader
 Gilbert Brule – 2006
 Michal Repik – 2007

Stafford Smythe Memorial Trophy
Memorial Cup MVP
 Milan Lucic – 2007

CHL Defenceman of the Year
 Jonathon Blum – 2009

Players

NHL alumni

NHL draftees
Note that these are the players who were drafted into the NHL while playing for the Vancouver Giants

 Marian Havel (Drafted by Washington Capitals in 2002; sixth round, 179th overall)
 Robin Kovar (Drafted by Edmonton Oilers in 2002; fourth round, 123rd overall
 Adam Courchaine (Drafted by Minnesota Wild in 2003; seventh round, 219th overall)
 Andrej Meszaros (Drafted by Ottawa Senators in 2004; 1st round, 23rd overall)
 Triston Grant (Drafted by Philadelphia Flyers in 2004; ninth round, 286th overall)
 Mark Fistric (Drafted by Dallas Stars in 2004; first round, 28th overall)
 Gilbert Brule (Drafted by Columbus Blue Jackets in 2005; first round, 6th overall)
 Cody Franson (Drafted by Nashville Predators in 2005; third round, 79th overall)
 J. D. Watt (Drafted by Calgary Flames in 2005; fourth round, 111th overall)
 Milan Lucic (Drafted by Boston Bruins in 2006; second round, 50th overall)
 Jonathon Blum (Drafted by Nashville Predators in 2007; first round, 23rd overall)
 Michal Repik (Drafted by Florida Panthers in 2007; second round, 40th overall)
 Spencer Machacek (Drafted by Atlanta Thrashers in 2007; third round, 67th overall)
 Tyson Sexsmith (Drafted by San Jose Sharks in 2007; third round, 91st overall)
 Lance Bouma (Drafted by Calgary Flames in 2008; third round, 78th overall)
 James Wright (Drafted by Tampa Bay Lightning in 2008; fourth round, 117th overall)
 Brent Regner (Drafted by Columbus Blue Jackets in 2008; fifth round, 137th overall)
 Evander Kane (Drafted by Atlanta Thrashers in 2009; first round, 4th overall)
 Craig Cunningham (Drafted by Boston Bruins in 2010; fourth round, 97th overall)
 Brendan Gallagher (Drafted by Montreal Canadiens in 2010; fifth round, 147th overall)
 David Musil (Drafted by Edmonton Oilers in 2011; second round, 31st overall)
 Marek Tvrdon (Drafted by Detroit Red Wings in 2011; fourth round, 115th overall)
 Jordan Martinook (Drafted by Phoenix Coyotes in 2012; second round, 58th overall)
 Brett Kulak (Drafted by Calgary Flames in 2012; fourth round, 105th overall)
 Mason Geertsen (Drafted by Colorado Avalanche in 2013; fourth round, 93rd overall)
 Jackson Houck (Drafted by Edmonton Oilers in 2013; fourth round, 94th overall)
 Tyler Benson (Drafted by Edmonton Oilers in 2016; second round, 32nd overall)
 Ty Ronning (Drafted by New York Rangers in 2016; seventh round, 201st overall)
 Milos Roman (Drafted by Calgary Flames in 2018; fourth round, 122nd overall))
 David Tendeck (Drafted by Arizona Coyotes in 2018; sixth round, 158th overall)
 Alex Kannok-Leipert (Drafted by Washington Capitals in 2018; sixth round, 161st overall)
 Bowen Byram (Drafted by Colorado Avalanche in 2019; first round, 4th overall)
 Trent Miner (Drafted by Colorado Avalanche in 2019; seventh round, 202nd overall)
 Justin Sourdif (Drafted by Florida Panthers in 2020; third round, 87th overall)
 Zack Ostapchuk (Drafted by Ottawa Senators  in 2021; second round, 39th overall)

Ring of Honour
 Brett Festerling (inducted on December 7, 2010)
 Andrej Meszaros (inducted on December 27, 2010)
 Mark Fistric (inducted on January 23, 2011)
 Gilbert Brule (inducted on January 28, 2011)
 Milan Lucic (inducted on February 25, 2011)
 Cody Franson (inducted on February 17, 2012)
 Evander Kane (inducted on March 7, 2012)
 Brendan Gallagher (inducted on February 15, 2014)
 Lance Bouma (inducted on November 20, 2015)
 Craig Cunningham (inducted on December 2, 2018)

Franchise scoring leaders
These are the top-ten point-scorers in franchise history as of completion of the 2021–22 season.

Note: Pos = Position; GP = Games played; G = Goals; A = Assists; Pts = Points; P/G = Points per game; * = current Giants player

Current roster
Updated January 11, 2023.

 

 
 
 
 

 

 
 

 - 

|}

Season-by-season record
Note: GP = Games played, W = Wins, L = Losses, T = Ties OTL = Overtime losses Pts, SOL = Shootout losses Pts, GF = Goals for, GA = Goals against

WHL Championship history
2005–06: Win, 4–0 vs Moose Jaw
2006–07: Loss, 3–4 vs Medicine Hat
2018–19: Loss, 3–4 vs Prince Albert

Memorial Cup Finals history
2007: Win, 3–1 vs Medicine Hat

Team records

See also
List of ice hockey teams in British Columbia
Vancouver Canucks

References

External links
 Vancouver Giants Official Web Site

Western Hockey League teams
Gia
Ice hockey clubs established in 2001
Ice hockey teams in British Columbia
Langley, British Columbia (district municipality)
2001 establishments in British Columbia